The 1984 Nations motorcycle Grand Prix was the second race of the 1984 Grand Prix motorcycle racing season. It took place on the weekend of 13–15 April 1984 at the Circuito Internazionale Santa Monica.

Classification

500 cc

References

Italian motorcycle Grand Prix
Italian
Motorcycle